Michael E. "Mike" Baroody (born September 14, 1946) is an American lobbyist.

Life and career

Baroody was born in Washington, D.C. and graduated from the University of Notre Dame (B.A., 1968). He served in the United States Navy in 1968 - 1970. In 1970 he began his career in the Washington office of Nebraska Senator Roman Hruska. From 1977 to 1980 he was research director and later director of public affairs at the Republican National Committee. In 1980 he served as Editor-in-Chief for Republican Platform.

From 1981 to 1985 Baroody served as Deputy Assistant to the President and Director of Public Affairs at the White House under Ronald Reagan. From 1985 to 1990 he was assistant secretary for policy at the United States Department of Labor during the Ronald Reagan and George H. W. Bush administrations.

From 1990 to 1993 he was senior vice president for policy and communications and later president of the Republican-oriented National Policy Forum. He also served as Bob Dole's Speechwriter and Executive Assistant. In 1994 he returned to the National Association of Manufacturers (NAM) to help build the Association's public affairs program, emphasizing greater involvement by NAM members in lobbying, policy and political activities inside and outside of Washington.  These involvement activities grew into a "third branch" of NAM's advocacy efforts, co-equal with the traditional lobbying and media-relations "branches" in Policy and Communications. From 1997 to 2002 he was board member of the National Center for Neighborhood Enterprise.

Since 1998, Baroody has been senior lobbyist for the National Association of Manufacturers, one of industry's most powerful lobbies. He oversees all of the NAM's advocacy efforts and represents the NAM on the Executive Committee of BIPAC, the influential Business-Industry Political Action Committee. In March 2007 President George W. Bush raised controversy after nominating Baroody as the new chairman of the Consumer Product Safety Commission. Baroody withdrew his name from consideration on May 23.

References

External links
 Bush expected to nominate Baroody to head CPSC
 Baroody resigns from National Policy Forum
 List of people passing between gov't and private sector - Baroody
 A protest site to Baroody's nomination to the CSA

1946 births
Living people
American lobbyists
Washington, D.C., Republicans
Reagan administration personnel